Christopher Edwin Theakstone (born 10 March 1812; date of death unknown) was an English first-class cricketer. While chief cashier of the Portsmouth branch of the Bank of England in March 1861 he absconded with over £1000. During his arrest the following month in Lambeth he cut his throat with a razor but survived. He was charged with embezzlement, pleaded guilty, and was sentenced to four years imprisonment. He was born in Pentonville, London.

Theakstone represented Hampshire, making his first-class debut in 1848 against an All-England Eleven. Theakstone played one further match for the county against the same opposition in 1849.

References

External links
C.E. Theakstone at Cricinfo
Christopher Theakstone at CricketArchive

1812 births
People from Pimlico
Cricketers from Greater London
English cricketers
Hampshire cricketers
Year of death unknown
19th-century English criminals
People convicted of embezzlement
English male criminals